The Players Tour Championship 2011/2012 – Event 4 (also known as the  2011 Paul Hunter Classic) was a professional minor-ranking snooker tournament that took place between 25 and 28 August 2011 in Fürth, Germany. Some of the preliminary round matches were held in Nürnberg. It was the first PTC event outside of the Grand Finals to be broadcast on television, as one table was screened on Eurosport.

Ronnie O'Sullivan made the 78th official maximum break during his last 32 match against Adam Duffy. This was O'Sullivan's 11th record 147 break.

Judd Trump was the defending champion, but he lost 3–4 in the last 32 against Andrew Higginson.

Mark Selby won in the final 4–0 against Mark Davis.

Prize fund and ranking points
The breakdown of prize money and ranking points of the event is shown below:

1 Only professional players can earn ranking points.

Main draw

Preliminary rounds

Round 1
Best of 7 frames

Round 2
Best of 7 frames

Round 3
Best of 7 frames

Main rounds

Top half

Section 1

Section 2

Section 3

Section 4

Bottom half

Section 5

Section 6

Section 7

Section 8

Finals

Century breaks 
Only from last 128 onwards.

 147, 107, 103, 102  Ronnie O'Sullivan
 142, 124  John Higgins
 139, 103  Ding Junhui
 135  Mark Davis
 135  Liu Song
 134, 117, 102  Neil Robertson
 131, 106  Steve Davis
 129, 105, 102  Jimmy Robertson
 129  Jamie Cope
 126, 119  Mark Selby
 121  Adam Duffy
 120  Jimmy White
 112, 108, 100  Yu Delu

 111  Andrew Higginson
 110  Zhang Anda
 109  David Gilbert
 108  Robbie Williams
 105  Marcus Campbell
 104  Shaun Murphy
 104  Matthew Stevens
 103  Sam Craigie
 103  Fergal O'Brien
 102  Alfie Burden
 102  Mike Dunn
 102  Mark King
 101  Sam Baird

References

External links 

 

2011
04
2011 in German sport
August 2011 sports events in Europe